The Ground Master 400 is a mobile radar system manufactured by Thales-Raytheon Systems, then Thales Group. GM400 is a fully digital active electronically scanned array long-range air defense 3D radar, offering detection from very high to very low altitudes. It tracks a wide range of targets from highly maneuverable tactical aircraft flying below several hundred feet to the unconventional small radar cross section devices, such as UAVs or cruise missiles.

The system can be set up by a four-man crew in 60 minutes and can be remotely operated. The system fits in a 20-feet shipping container and weighs less than ten tons. The system can be rapidly deployed mounted on a 6x6 or 8x8 tactical truck and can be transported by a single C-130 aircraft or a helicopter.

The GM400 with a field-proven operational availability of more than 98,5% and a MTBCF of 3500 hrs has been selected by many countries as well as France to protect the European Space Agency's Guiana Space Centre. The system was to be operational by the end of 2012.

The GM400 family includes the GM403 and the GM406. The GM406 has a transmitter which is twice as powerful as the GM403, giving it 20% greater range, increasing from 390 km to 450 km. The GM406 is primarily designed to equip fixed sites, with the GM403 designed to be deployable.

In 2021, Thales introduced a new version, GM400α, with 5 times more processing power, extended range to 515 km and upcoming advanced artificial intelligence algorithms.

These radars are part of the Ground Master family (like GM200, GM60, GM200 MM/A and MM/C) which has been selected by many countries.

Main characteristics

 Air Surveillance Radar
 Crew: 4
 S-band, 3D AESA Radar
 GaN technology
 Modern algorithm to mitigate windfarm effect
 10 RPM Rotation Rate
 High, medium and low-altitude detection, long-range air defense sensor 
 Detects fixed- and rotary-wing aircraft, cruise missiles, UAVs, and tactical ballistic missiles 
Coverage:
 Azimuth: 360°
 Elevation: 20° and 40°
Performance:
Detection range:
Fighter aircraft: > 450 km
Cruise missile: > 250 km
Max detection rate in altitude: 30.5 km
Instrumented range: 515 km
 High mobility, transportability, and reliability
 GM400 requires minimum maintenance (30 hours/year)
 Technical characteristics:
Digital Beam Forming 
Stacked beam (maximum time on target) technology
S-Band (high part 2.9 / 3.3 GHz)
Clear & Doppler modes
Electronic Counter-CounterMeasures (ECCM) capabilities
Tactical ballistic missile (TBM) detection capability.

Operators
: 2 Ground Master 403 systems
: 12 Ground Master 403 systems. Local designation is Keva 2010.
: 2 systems GM 406 in 2017, 3 in 2019, 12 systems GM 403 in 2022,
: 6 GM 403 and GM 200 systems
: 6 systems
: 4 systems
: 13 GM 403 systems
: 2 systems
: 2 Ground Master 403 systems.
: 9 systems
: 3 systems
: 4 systems 
: 2 systems 
: 2 systems on order, delivery in 2023
: 2 systems

See also
 KALKAN Air Defence Radar
 TAFLIR, another ground-based, non-fixed (i.e., transportable) search radar (AN/TPS)
 AN/TPS-43
 AN/TPS-75

External links 
 Ground Master 400 Alpha - Thales Group

References

Ground radars
Military radars of France
Thales Group